ERMF may refer to:

Medicine, science and technology
 Estimated radiographic magnification factor, for projection radiography

Business processes
 Enterprise risk management framework